Terra Nova is an oil field development project based off the coast of Newfoundland, discovered in 1984 by Petro-Canada. Terra Nova is the first harsh environment development in North America to use a Floating Production Storage and Offloading (FPSO) vessel, Terra Nova. Production from the field began in January 2002 off the coast of Newfoundland, with an expected life of 15–17 years. After stopping production in 2019, the project restructured in 2021, moving to Ferrol, Spain for repairs. Terra Nova is expected to be back in production in Newfoundland at the end of 2022.

The oil is produced from Late Jurassic sandstone within the Jeanne d'Arc Formation.  The reservoir was deposited as a large braided fluvial system.  The discovery well was Terra Nova K-08 drilled in 1984 by Petro-Canada.

Several studies concerning fish health around the Terra Nova oil field before and after produced water had been discharged indicates that it has had no significant effects on the health of the American plaice.

See also
Hibernia
Orphan basin
Sable Island
White Rose

External links
 Terra Nova Offshore Opportunity
 Map of Canadian Oil and gas infrastructure

References 

Oil fields of Newfoundland and Labrador